Club Deportivo Tarancón (or CD Tarancón) is a Spanish football team located in Tarancón, Cuenca, in the autonomous community of Castilla–La Mancha. Founded in 1995 it currently plays in Tercera División – Group 18, holding home matches at Estadio Municipal Tarancón with a capacity of 1,500 spectators.

History 
CD Tarancón was founded in 1995. The club won Preferente Castilla La Mancha in 2018 and promoted to the Tercera División.

Season to season 

7 seasons in Tercera División

Notable players 

 Soumaïla Konaré
 Álvaro Corral

References

Football clubs in Castilla–La Mancha
Association football clubs established in 1995
Divisiones Regionales de Fútbol clubs
1995 establishments in Spain
Province of Cuenca